Zulkarnain (born on September 14, 1982, in Medan) is an Indonesian footballer who currently plays for PS Kwarta in the Liga Indonesia Premier Division.

Club statistics

References

External links

1982 births
Living people
Sportspeople from Medan
Association football midfielders
Indonesian footballers
Liga 1 (Indonesia) players
PSMS Medan players
Indonesian Premier Division players
Persiraja Banda Aceh players
PSDS Deli Serdang players
PSPS Pekanbaru players
PSSB Bireuen players